Catherine Moira Sharkey (born 1970) is a professor of law at the New York University School of Law.

Biography

In 1992, Sharkey graduated with a bachelor's degree in Economics from Yale University, summa cum laude, where she was tapped for Skull and Bones. She went on to the University of Oxford as a Rhodes scholar, graduating in 1994 with a master of science in Economics for Development, with honors and with distinction. Catherine then attended Yale Law School, where she was an Executive Editor of the Yale Law Journal, graduating with a J.D. in 1997.

After law school, Sharkey clerked for judge Guido Calabresi of the United States Court of Appeals for the Second Circuit, and then for justice David Souter of the United States Supreme Court from 1998 to 1999.

In 2007, she joined the faculty at NYU School of Law, and is currently the Crystal Eastman Professor of Law. Her scholarship focuses on torts, punitive damages, class actions, remedies, products liability, administrative law, and empirical legal studies. Previously, she taught at Columbia Law School and practiced as an appellate litigation associate at Mayer Brown in New York.

She is a member of both the American Law Institute and Administrative Conference of the United States.

Sharkey is occasionally mentioned as a potential future United States Supreme Court nominee.

Selected publications

See also 

 List of law clerks of the Supreme Court of the United States (Seat 3)

References

External links
Profile at New York University

1970 births
Living people
American jurists
American Rhodes Scholars
Yale Law School alumni
Law clerks of the Supreme Court of the United States
New York University faculty
New York University School of Law faculty
Lawyers from New York City
Lawyers from New Haven, Connecticut
Scholars of tort law
American legal writers
21st-century American lawyers